Events from the year 1558 in France

Incumbents
 Monarch – Henry II

Events

1 to 8 January – The siege of Calais
17 April to 23 July – The siege of Thionville
13 July – The Battle of Gravelines

Births

9 September – Philippe Emmanuel, Duke of Mercœur, soldier and prominent member of the Catholic League (died 1602).
8 December – François de La Rochefoucauld, Cardinal (died 1645)
9 December – André du Laurens, physician (died 1609)
30 December – Jacques-Nompar de Caumont, duc de La Force, a marshal of France and peer of France (died 1652)

Full date missing
Françoise de Cezelli, war hero during the French Wars of Religion (died 1615)
Cardin Le Bret, jurist (died 1655)
Fronton du Duc, Jesuit theologian (died 1624)
Guillaume de Steenhuys, noble magistrate and diplomat (died 1638)

Deaths

26 April – Jean Fernel, physician (born 1497)

Full date missing
Côme Clausse, notary and secretary of the king, Secretary of State (born c. 1530) 
André Tiraqueau, jurist and politician (born 1488) 
Guillaume Bochetel, statesman and diplomat 
Claude d'Urfé, French royal official (born 1501) 
Jean Maynier, public official, First President of the Parliament of Aix-en-Provence (born 1495) 
Clément Janequin, composer (born c. 1485) 
Mellin de Saint-Gelais, poet (born c. 1491)

See also

References

1550s in France